The 2021 Croatian Futsal Cup is the 29th season of the Croatian Futsal Cup, the national cup for men's futsal teams in Croatia, since its establishment in 1993.

Calendar

Regional stage
Regional staged include three regions, each playing its own cup where the winner will be qualifies for round of 16 final stage.

East Region Cup 
The East Region Cup was played by 10 clubs from Slavonia.

South Region Cup 
The South Region Cup was played by 13 clubs from Dalmatia.

West Region Cup 
The West Region Cup was played by 10 clubs from Northern, Western and Central Croatia.

Round of 16
The pairs of the round of 16 were announced after the end of the regional cups.

Quarter-finals
The quarter-finals draw was held on 25 November 2021.

Final four
The semi-finals draw was held on 6 December 2021 at 14:00 CET. On 28 November 2021 it was decided that Pula will be hosting the Final four tournament.

Semi-finals

Final

References

2021 in futsal
Futsal competitions in Croatia
2020–21 in European futsal
2021–22 in European futsal